Hinson is a surname

List of people with the surname 

 Ashley Hinson (born 1983), American politician
 Barry Hinson (born 1961), American basketball coach
 David R. Hinson (born 1933), American pilot and former head of Midway Airlines
 Darnell Hinson (born 1980), American basketball player
 Jon Hinson (1942–1995), American politician from Mississippi
 Jack Hinson  (c. 1807–1874), Confederate sniper of the American Civil War
 Jimbeau Hinson (19502-2022), American country music singer
 Jordan Hinson (born 1991), American actress
 Lance Hinson, American coach of college football
 Larry Hinson (born 1944), American professional golfer
 Micah P. Hinson (born 1981), American Americana singer and guitarist
 Paul Hinson (1904–1960), American professional baseball player
 Roy Hinson (born 1961), American professional basketball player
Yvonne Hayes Hinson, American politician
 Unknown Hinson (born Stuart Daniel Baker in 1954), musician and voice actor
 The Hinsons (namely Ronny, Kenny, Larry, Yvonne, Eric and Bo), an American Southern Gospel group

See also 

 Hansen (surname)
 Hanson (surname)
 Henson (name)
Kinson
Linson

Surnames
Patronymic surnames
English-language surnames
Surnames of English origin
Surnames of British Isles origin